Bankhead is a train station in Atlanta, Georgia, the western terminus of the Green Line in the Metropolitan Atlanta Rapid Transit Authority (MARTA) rail system. The Bankhead Marta Station is located in the Grove Park Neighborhood due to a recent neighborhood expansion. This station primarily serves the neighborhoods of Grove Park, Bankhead, West Lake, Howell Station, and other Westside residents. Bankhead Station provides connecting bus service to Donald Lee Hollowell Highway, Maddox Park, and the future Westside Park at Bellwood Quarry; which will be the largest park in the city of Atlanta

Unlike most MARTA stations, which are provisioned for eight rail cars, Bankhead can only accommodate two cars, with adequate space left in place to allow extension to four cars in the future. It is the only station served exclusively by the Green Line.

The area it serves is scheduled to be an important part of the Belt Line, near Maddox Park and the new Westside Park, which would be the largest park in the city of Atlanta.

Station layout

History
Bankhead Station was opened on December 12, 1992, the same day as Doraville. The Green Line is a stub of the originally planned Proctor Creek Line, which was planned to expand north of Bankhead to the Perry Homes community, now called West Highlands. In addition, the Proctor Creek Line has another stub in between the Edgewood/Candler Park and East Lake Stations. This included plans for an additional 2 stations, one at Emory University and another in North Druid Hills.

MARTA recently announced a proposal to change the name of Bankhead station to Donald Lee Hollowell Station, reflecting the new name of Bankhead Highway.

Future
The platform is scheduled to be lengthened to accommodate six-car trains by 2025, due to significant development planned around the station. This would allow longer trains to run on the Green Line and could make way for a potential extension towards Cobb County.

Nearby landmarks & popular destinations
 Maddox Park
 BeltLine Westside Trail
 King Plow Arts Center
Fulton County Jail
Fulton County Division of Family and Children Services

Bus routes
The station is served by the following MARTA bus routes:
 Route 26 - Marietta Street / Perry Boulevard.
 Route 50 - Donald Lee Hollowell Parkway

References

External links
Station Overview, including video tour
MARTA Guide
Atlanta Beltline Westside Trail
 Donald Lee Holowell Bankhead entrance from Google Maps Street View

Green Line (MARTA)
Metropolitan Atlanta Rapid Transit Authority stations
Railway stations in Atlanta
Railway stations in the United States opened in 1992
1992 establishments in Georgia (U.S. state)